SAFEGE is an acronym for the French consortium Société Anonyme Française d' Etude de Gestion et d' Entreprises and is pronounced  in English.

Company
The consortium, consisting of 25 companies, including the tire-maker Michelin and the Renault automotive company, is a consulting and engineering bureau. It was formed in 1919 as Société Auxiliaire Française d'Électricité, Gaz et Eau, a holding company with interests in private water, gas, and electricity production and distribution. When in 1947, these public utilities were nationalised, the company became the engineering and consulting office which it is today, taking the name Société Anonyme Française d'Études, de Gestion et d'Entreprises.

Today the company is a subsidiary of Suez Environnement and specialises as a consultancy in water and environmental engineering, but not only (bought IDC, etc.) Its main market is France, with 60% of the turnover. It also is a leader in several consortias beneficiaries of lots from the EC FWCs (6, 11 and coleading the 2).

SAFEGE type monorail

SAFEGE gained international recognition for its design of a suspended monorail in the 1960s. The design team was headed by Lucien Chadenson.

Design concept
The design of the system entails suspending passenger cars beneath rubber-tired wheel carriages of the type used more conventionally in the Paris Metro. The carriages are enclosed and supported by a box-like track or beam, with an opening in the bottom. The rubber wheels of the train run inside the track, supported by flanges on the bottom of the beam.

Unlike previous suspended monorails like the Schwebebahn in Wuppertal, Germany, the tracks are not exposed to inclement weather, and do not need any cleaning or ice-removal systems. This advantage enables them to run in cities where ice and other conditions would impair the reliability of the system.

Test installation
The test track built in France by SAFEGE in 1959, was a  monorail line that featured prominently in the 1966 movie adaptation of Fahrenheit 451, directed by François Truffaut. Although the track was dismantled not long thereafter, the original car survived longer.

Market position
SAFEGE systems are the leading type of suspended railway in transit use, though this consists of just four installations of two different systems. Its chief and more numerous competitor in modern monorail applications are variations of the German-designed ALWEG system, in which the vehicles run on top of, and straddle, a solid beam.

SAFEGE-type monorails in the world

Mitsubishi Heavy Industries
Mitsubishi Heavy Industries of Japan has developed a working system of SAFEGE-type suspended railways, and have made three such installations, two of which remain in operation today.

From early 1964 to December 1974, a  single-line ran between Higashiyama Zoo and the nearby Botanical Gardens in Nagoya, Japan. While initially popular, it also suffered from mechanical problems and after the first two years of operation, the novelty wore off and it began making a loss. Plans to expand the zoo and gardens hastened its demise, although the car and a section of track is preserved at one of the stations. While it was initially marketed as a ride, rather than a means of transport, a fare was charged, making it the first revenue-earning SAFEGE/Mitsubishi-type monorail.
In 1970 the Shonan Monorail opened. It runs from Ōfuna Station in Kamakura to Shōnan-Enoshima Station in Fujisawa. 
In 1988, the first stage of the Chiba Urban Monorail system opened, in Chiba. With a  route length, it is the longest suspended monorail in the world.

Siemens
Two Siemens SIPEM lines exist in Germany, one on the Dortmund University campus, the other at the Düsseldorf airport. Siemens no longer actively markets this system, but does still deliver the software for the automatic operation of a SIPEM network and vehicles.

Unfulfilled proposals
In 1966, a proposal was considered to construct a SAFEGE-type monorail in the City of Manchester. The  line was planned to link Manchester Airport with the city and suburbs, with a tunnel under the city centre, but the scheme, along with the later Picc-Vic tunnel (which would be a conventional rapid transit line) was abandoned due to cost. The city eventually developed its own light rail network, Manchester Metrolink, of which one of its lines, opened in 2014, now links Manchester Airport to the city centre.

In November 1967, General Electric proposed to construct a SAFEGE monorail from downtown San Francisco to San Francisco International Airport. The City of San Francisco studied the proposal, along with an extension of the Southern Pacific Railroad's Peninsula Commute commuter rail line and an extension of the BART rapid transit system. The proposal's incompatibility with other rail transit lines, the urban design concerns of an elevated guideway, and potential competitive impact on parallel rapid transit lines, led to its dismissal in favor of a BART extension. Ultimately SFO was connected to downtown San Francisco via BART in 2003.

References

External links 

 Monorail society: Technical Page - Safege. Retrieved May 25, 2008.
 SAFEGE company Web site, in English
 SAFEGE in Poland website

Suspended monorails
 
Monorails
Monorails in France